Chapter VI is the fifth studio album by Swedish doom metal band Candlemass released in 1992. This was the first Candlemass album not to feature Messiah Marcolin on vocals since 1986's Epicus Doomicus Metallicus. On this one, Thomas Vikström took his place. After poor sales of the album, Candlemass subsequently disbanded in early 1994, only to reform three years later.

Track listing

Personnel

Candlemass
 Thomas Vikström - vocals
 Lars Johansson - lead guitar
 Mats Björkman - rhythm guitar
 Leif Edling - bass guitar, producer
 Jan Lindh - drums

Production
Rex Gisslén - producer, engineer, mixing
Tomas Arfert - artwork

Charts

References

Candlemass (band) albums
1992 albums
Music for Nations albums